John Hughes (died 1543) was an English politician. He was a Member of Parliament (MP) for Middlesex from 1542 to 1543.

References

Year of death unknown
Members of the Parliament of England for Middlesex
Year of birth missing
Place of birth missing
English MPs 1542–1544